Reginald Pole Carew (28 July 1753 – 3 January 1835) was a British politician.

Rt. Hon. Reginald Pole-Carew was born the son of Reginald Pole and Anne Buller of Stoke Damerel, Plymouth, Devon. He was educated at Winchester College and University College, Oxford and entered the Middle Temple in 1770. He lived at Antony House, Cornwall.

Career
In 1782 he became MP for Penryn, in 1787 he became MP for Reigate and in 1790 he became MP for Lostwithiel. Then in 1796 he became MP for Fowey, giving up the seat in 1799 on taking Crown office as an Auditor of Public Accounts, but resuming his seat in 1802. In August 1803, he became Under-Secretary of State for the Home Department and in January 1805 was made a Privy Counsellor. In 1812 he became MP for Lostwithiel. .

He was elected a Fellow of the Royal Society in 1788.

Art collection
Carew was a personal friend of Sir Joshua Reynolds who painted his portrait. He formed a substantial collection of etchings by Rembrandt, which were sold after his death by Benjamin Wheatley in London, 13–15 May 1835. Among the buyers was the British Museum who bought several examples.

Marriages and issue
He married Jemima Yorke, the daughter of Hon. John Yorke and Elizabeth Lygon, on 18 November 1784. Their children were:

Harriet Carew d. 4 Mar 1877, married John Eliot, 1st Earl of St Germans
Caroline Pole-Carew, married James Bucknall Bucknall Estcourt

He married, secondly, Hon. Caroline Anne Lyttelton, daughter of William Henry Lyttelton, 1st Lord Lyttelton, Baron of Frankley and Caroline Bristow, on 4 May 1808. Their children were:

Frances Antonia Pole-Carew d. 27 Feb 1889
William Henry Pole-Carew b. 30 Jul 1811, d. 20 Jan 1888

He died on 3 January 1835 at age 81.

References

|-

|-

|-

|-

1753 births
1835 deaths
People from Antony, Cornwall
People educated at Winchester College
Alumni of University College, Oxford
Members of the Middle Temple
Reginald
Reginald
Members of the Parliament of Great Britain for English constituencies
Members of the Parliament of Great Britain for constituencies in Cornwall
British MPs 1780–1784
British MPs 1784–1790
British MPs 1790–1796
British MPs 1796–1800
Members of the Parliament of the United Kingdom for constituencies in Cornwall
UK MPs 1812–1818
Members of the Privy Council of the United Kingdom